The 190s decade ran from January 1, 190, to December 31, 199.

Significant people
 Septimius Severus, Roman Emperor

References